Zinc finger protein 613 is a protein that in humans is encoded by the ZNF613 gene.

References

Further reading 

Molecular biology
Proteins
Proteomics